Tiago Mendonca (born 8 October 1995) is a Portuguese footballer who plays as a midfielder.

Career

New England Revolution II
In January 2020, Mendonca signed with New England Revolution II of USL League One. He made his competitive debut for the club on 25 July 2020 against Union Omaha.

Mendonca was not announced as a returning player for the club's 2022 season where they'd be competing in the newly formed MLS Next Pro.

References

External links
Tiago Mendonca at Providence College Athletics

1995 births
Living people
People from Faro, Portugal
Providence Friars men's soccer players
New England Revolution II players
USL League One players
Portuguese footballers
Portuguese expatriate footballers
Association football midfielders
Sportspeople from Faro District